Ahmad Hawkins (born December 10, 1978) is a former American football defensive back. He played college football at Virginia. He was signed by the Colorado Crush as a street free agent in 2003.

Hawkins also played for the Berlin Thunder, Nashville Kats, Grand Rapids Rampage, Alabama Vipers and Georgia Force.

External links
Grand Rapids Rampage bio

1978 births
Living people
Sportspeople from Hampton, Virginia
Players of American football from Virginia
American football cornerbacks
American football safeties
American football wide receivers
Virginia Cavaliers football players
Berlin Thunder players
Colorado Crush players
Nashville Kats players
Grand Rapids Rampage players
Alabama Vipers players
Georgia Force players